Espoir FC is a Nigerien football club based in Zinder. Their home games are played at Stade de Zinder.

Achievements
Niger Premier League: 1
 1984

Niger Cup: 2
 1984, 1985

Football clubs in Niger
Super Ligue (Niger) clubs
Zinder